Yuriy Leontiyovych Moroz (born 8 September 1970) is a Ukrainian professional football coach and a former player.

Career
He made his professional debut in the Soviet Second League in 1986 for SKA Kyiv.

Honours
 Soviet Top League champion: 1990.
 Ukrainian Premier League champion: 1993.
 Ukrainian Premier League runner-up: 1992.

European club competitions
 1990–91 European Cup Winners' Cup with FC Dynamo Kyiv: 1 game.
 1991–92 European Cup with FC Dynamo Kyiv: 7 games, 1 goal.
 1997–98 UEFA Cup with FC Alania Vladikavkaz: 1 game, 1 goal.

References

1970 births
People from Smila
Living people
Soviet footballers
Association football defenders
Ukrainian footballers
Ukraine international footballers
SKA Kiev players
FC Dynamo Kyiv players
NK Veres Rivne players
Hapoel Be'er Sheva F.C. players
Bnei Yehuda Tel Aviv F.C. players
Maccabi Jaffa F.C. players
FC Spartak Vladikavkaz players
FC Moscow players
FC Lokomotiv Nizhny Novgorod players
FC Hoverla Uzhhorod players
FC Vorskla Poltava players
Soviet Top League players
Ukrainian Premier League players
Ukrainian First League players
Russian Premier League players
Ukrainian expatriate footballers
Expatriate footballers in Israel
Expatriate footballers in Russia
Ukrainian expatriate sportspeople in Israel
Ukrainian expatriate sportspeople in Russia
Ukrainian football managers
FC Systema-Boreks Borodianka managers
FC Chornomorets Odesa managers
Ukrainian Premier League managers
Sportspeople from Cherkasy Oblast